The 2021–22 Panathinaikos season is the club's 63rd consecutive season in Super League Greece. They also compete in the Greek Cup.

On 21 May 2022, Panathinaikos defeated PAOK in the Greek Cup Final to win the domestic cup for the 19th time in club's history.

Players

Current squad

Transfers

In

Loans in

Loan returns

Loans out

Out

Pre-season and friendlies

Competitions

Super League Greece

League table

Regular season

Play-off round

Greek Football Cup

Fifth round

Round of 16

Quarter-finals

Semi-finals

Final

References

External links
 Panathinaikos FC official website

Panathinaikos
Panathinaikos F.C. seasons